Age of the Sun is the second album by The Sunshine Fix, the solo project of The Olivia Tremor Control's Bill Doss. It was released in 2002 on Elephant 6.

Track listing
 "Age of the Sun" – 3:24
 "Ultraviolet Orchestra" – 0:27
 "That Ole Sun" – 3:26
 "Everything Is Waking" – 3:49
 "Digging to China" – 4:09
 "A Better Way to Be" – 3:03
 "An Illuminated Array" – 0:44
 "See Yourself" – 3:44
 "Inside the Nebula" – 1:21
 "Hide in the Light" – 2:10
 "Sail Beyond the Sunset" – 3:08
 "A 93 Million Mile Moment" – 1:39
 "Mr. Summer Day" – 3:50
 "72 Years" – 2:32
 "Cycles of Time" – 1:22
 "Le Roi-Soleil" – 20:30

References

2002 albums
The Elephant 6 Recording Company albums
The Sunshine Fix albums